Dyadobacter hamtensis  is a bacterium from the genus of Dyadobacter which has been isolatedc from the Hamta glacier in the Himalayas in India.

References

Further reading 
 

Cytophagia
Bacteria described in 2005